Miss Russia 2013, was held in the Crocus National Exhibition Hall in Moscow on March 1, 2013. 50 contestants from all over Russia competed for the crown. The winner will represents Russia into Miss Universe 2013 and Miss World 2013.

Each year, there are 477 beauty contests in states and cities of Russia to go to compete in the Miss Russia. Each year, 4 months before the national competition, a pre-preliminary happens in Moscow to select the 50 official candidates.

Results

Placements

Contestants

References

External links
 Miss Russia Official Website

Miss Russia
2013 beauty pageants
2013 in Russia